The Tipton-Black Willow Ranch Historic District, in Mora County
and San Miguel County in New Mexico, near Watrous, dates from 1862. It was listed on the National Register of Historic Places in 2001.

Some part of it includes elements of Italianate style.

Enoch Tipton Ranch

Architect: Tipton, Enoch; Tipton, Charles Q.
Architecture: Italianate
Historic function: Domestic; Agriculture/subsistence; Funerary
Historic subfunction: Single Dwelling; Agricultural Outbuildings; Irrigation Facility; Cemetery
Criteria: event, architecture/engineering

References

Ranches in New Mexico
Historic districts on the National Register of Historic Places in New Mexico
National Register of Historic Places in Mora County, New Mexico
National Register of Historic Places in San Miguel County, New Mexico
Italianate architecture in New Mexico
Buildings and structures completed in 1862